Bunny is a daily webcomic by Lem (b. 1984-03-20), the pseudonym of a Welsh artist named Huw Davies. Launched in August 2004, Bunny follows the gag-a-day formula, with no true plotline. The subject matter of Bunny varies widely (with topics ranging from popular Internet culture, to current events to rabbit ninjas), but usually portrays the pink bunny protagonist's uncomplicated take on a given situation. Starting with Strip #862 on 2007-03-31 the comic changed from its long rectangular format to a taller and narrower horizontal rectangular format. The shape of the panels currently vary.

In February 2007 Bunny was placed under a Creative Commons Attribution-Noncommercial-Share Alike 3.0 license.

Starting on 2007-12-24 with strip #1067, tooltip (better known as title text) became a part of most comics.

Characters

The Pink Bunny The Pink Bunny is the main character and the strip's only constant. In early strips, the Pink Bunny seemed taken by flying old airplanes, and sometimes has seemed to be gifted with insight and stupidity. The Pink Bunny is also seen skateboarding on some occasions. The Pink Bunny's language relates everything to itself; everything, no matter how seemingly unrelated, is described as integral to the Bunny's being.

The Blue Bunny The Blue Bunny (sometimes called purple) may or may not be the Pink Bunny's cousin, commonly used as a random extra character. The Blue Bunny's language does not describe objects per se, but instead describes where they might go or be seen, or what they might do.

The Orange Bunny The Orange Bunny also may or may not be the Pink Bunny's cousin. The Orange bunny has always seemed quite malicious, known to love explosions, and is apparently using its life for scenes of destruction and being annoying. The Orange Bunny does not have a language per se; as the only one of his kind, he communicates via telepathy.

 Others

The randomly appearing ninja, pirate, and stealth ninja pirate bunnies share a love for watermelons and Canada, coming in mostly to present the idea of battle or war. They are known to communicate via sign language.

The comic "Extended Family" shows different colored bunnies, including green, red, yellow, and navy. Humans are very rarely drawn, and a squirrel character has appeared twice as a friend of the Pink Bunny. Bats, bunny zombies, and alien parasites have also appeared. A ninja character has made recurring, traffic courtesy-themed appearances, starting in "Now You See Him, Now You Don't." Bunnies also occasionally keep small, fuzzy, orange creatures called Peevs around as pets.

The comic "next year's edinburgh military tattoo entry" shows an extra green bunny.

Printed editions

The Bunny book contains ninety completely redrawn strips exclusively for the print version. The book is published by Freak Ash Books, and distributed both by them and Lem (Huw Davies) himself. The second Bunny book, The Book of Perpetual Bewilderment was published in December 2007 by Freak Ash Books.

 Davies, Huw. The Selected Strips of Bunny: The Book of Random. Freak Ash Books.
 Davies, Huw. Bunny: Book of Random Pt. 2: The Book of Perpetual Bewilderment. Freak Ash Books.  (ISBN )  (ISBN )

External links 

British comedy webcomics
Webcomics in print
2000s webcomics
Short form webcomics
Creative Commons-licensed comics
Gag-a-day comics
Fictional rabbits and hares
Comics about rabbits and hares
2004 webcomic debuts
2012 webcomic endings